WFST (600 AM) is a radio station licensed to Caribou, Maine, United States.  The station is owned by Northern Broadcast Ministries.

History 
WFST used to be a daytimer, with an FM on 97.7 now part of the Channel X Radio network of stations .

References

External links

FST
Moody Radio affiliate stations
Caribou, Maine
Radio stations established in 1956
1956 establishments in Maine